KPRW (99.5 FM, "The Lakes 99.5") is a radio station broadcasting an adult contemporary format serving Perham, Minnesota.  The station is currently owned by Leighton Broadcasting, through licensee Leighton Radio Holdings, Inc.

The studios and offices are at 235 West Main Street, Perham, Mn.   The transmitter site is east of Perham, Minnesota, on Highway 10.

The station is locally programmed with local hosts putting emphasis on local events, news, sports and weather.

External links
Lakes 99.5 Online

Radio stations in Minnesota
Hot adult contemporary radio stations in the United States
Radio stations established in 1985
1985 establishments in Minnesota